The women's BMX racing competition at the 2012 Olympic Games in London took place at the BMX track at the Velopark within the Olympic Park, from 8 to 10 August.

Mariana Pajón from Colombia won the gold medal — the only at the 2012 Games for the country — with a winning time of 37.706 seconds. Sarah Walker from New Zealand won the silver medal and Laura Smulders of the Netherlands took bronze.

Competition format 

The riders were seeded into semi-finals based on time trials. The semi-finals consist of three runs, with the top four riders in each group advancing to the final. The final was a one-run contest.

Schedule 
All times are British Summer Time (UTC+1)

Results

Seeding run

Semi-finals

Semi-final 1

Semi-final 2

Final

See also
Cycling at the 2012 Summer Olympics – Men's BMX

References

Cycling at the 2012 Summer Olympics
BMX at the Summer Olympics
2012 in women's BMX
Women's events at the 2012 Summer Olympics